Jace Daniels (born March 3, 1989) is an American football college coach. He had played professionally as an offensive tackle.

Playing career

College
Daniels played college football at Northern Michigan.

Professional

Tampa Bay Buccaneers
Daniels signed with the Tampa Bay Buccaneers and remained on the practice squad throughout the 2013 season. He continues with the Bucs for the 2014 season and awaits camp which will decide when the player moves up to 2nd string. The Buccaneers released Daniels on August 24, 2014.

Winnipeg Blue Bombers
Daniels was signed by the Winnipeg Blue Bombers on October 7, 2014.

Baltimore Brigade
Daniels was assigned to the Baltimore Brigade on February 7, 2017.

Coaching career
Daniels ibegan his college coaching career as the offensive line coach at his alma mater, Northern Michigan, in 2017 and 2018. He then moved to Michigan Tech in 2019, where he resumed being the offensive line coach. As of 2021 he is still at Michigan Tech.

References

External links

Michigan Tech coaching bio

1989 births
Living people
American football offensive tackles
American players of Canadian football
Baltimore Brigade players
Canadian football offensive linemen
Michigan Tech Huskies football coaches
Northern Michigan Wildcats football coaches
Northern Michigan Wildcats football players
Tampa Bay Buccaneers players
People from Escanaba, Michigan
Players of American football from Michigan
Winnipeg Blue Bombers players